Soo Wai Ming (born 14 October 1977), better known by her stage name Carmen Soo, is a Malaysian model and actress.

Life and career
Soo was born and raised in Kuala Lumpur, Malaysia, to a Chinese father and to a half-Chinese, half-British mother. She holds a bachelor's degree in business management and can speak fluent Malay, Cantonese and English while also learning Tagalog to help her television acting career in the Philippines. She was part owner of a boutique named 'Kushi' located in Bangsar.

In 2015, Soo married Benson Tan in Bali and they have one daughter. She currently resides in Petaling Jaya, Selangor with her family.

Modeling
Carmen Soo began modelling at age 17 and moved to Hong Kong at age 20 to pursue modelling career, which has brought her all over Asia, including Singapore.  At 156 cm (just under 5'1") tall, her petite size is not conducive to catwalk modeling, hence most of her shoots tend to be print and television commercials. However, she has graced local magazines' covers such as New Man, V Mag, New Tide GLAM and Nu You. She is a spokesperson for international watch brand Longines along with Malaysian theatre personality Paula Malai Ali, and for Celcom with Singaporean singer JJ Lin.
Soo is the brand ambassador of Uniqlo Malaysia. She managed by Model
One in Hong Kong.

Acting 
Carmen started as an extra in the 1999 Jackie Chan movie entitled Gorgeous alongside Shu Qi, and later was in Aaron Kwok's musical special.

In September 2008, Carmen co-starred in an ABS-CBN (in collaboration with Malaysia's Double Vision) soap opera with Filipino actors Jericho Rosales, Cristine Reyes and Christopher de Leon in the teleserye Kahit Isang Saglit that was aired in the Philippines and Malaysia, and worldwide through TFC. Kahit Isang Saglit later earned a nomination in the International Emmy Award.

In 2010, Carmen appeared in a four-part series of  Your Song entitled "Beautiful Girl" with Christian Bautista, which was shot through mid-July and August between Malaysia and the Philippines. In the same year, she appeared alongside JC De Vera in the third season of 5 Star Specials entitled Si Paco at ang Prinsesa, directed by Bb. Joyce Bernal on TV5.

Carmen was the lead actor in the Malaysian horror film The Hunter 3D, directed and written by Bjarne Wong. Soo then went on to perform on HBO Asia's Dead Mine as Su-Ling. She also appeared in the Singaporean horror film Ghost Child, alongside Chen Hanwei and Jayley Woo.

Hosting 
In 2009, Soo became a judge on  It's Showtime. In April 2010, Soo became a co-host on Wowowee along with Kelly Misa, Jed Montero, Isabelle Abiera, RR Enriquez, Valerie Concepcion, Mariel Rodriguez and Pokwang.

Filmography

Film

Television

Theatre

Awards
Most Promising Actress Award at the Malaysian Film Festival 2006

References

External links
 
 

1977 births
Living people
Malaysian people of British descent
Malaysian people of Chinese descent
Malaysian people of English descent
Malaysian Christians
Malaysian female models
21st-century Malaysian actresses
Malaysian expatriates in the Philippines